) is a Japanese professional golfer.

Professional career 
Ozaki was born in Tokushima Prefecture, Japan. He turned professional in 1977 and won 32 tournaments on the Japan Golf Tour between 1984 and 2005. He ranks fourth on the list of most Japan Golf Tour wins. He topped the money list in 1991 and 1999. He is fifth on the career money list (through 2014).

Ozaki played 185 times on the PGA Tour from 1984 to 2001, primarily from 1993 to 2001. His best finish was a T-2 at the 1997 Buick Open. His best finish in a major championship was a T-25 at the 1993 U.S. Open.

In 2005, he came in third at the Champions Tour Qualifying Tournament, and he began play on that tour after turning 50 in May 2006. His best finishes are a playoff loss at the 2007 Boeing Classic and a T-2 in the 2010 Regions Charity Classic.

Ozaki played on the International Team in the 1998 Presidents Cup.

Ozaki's older brother, Masashi "Jumbo" Ozaki, topped the Japan Golf Tour money list twelve times, and another brother, Tateo "Jet" Ozaki, is also a professional golfer.

Professional wins (38)

Japan Golf Tour wins (32)

*Note: Tournament shortened to 54 holes due to rain.
 The 2000 Japan Open Golf Championship was also a Japan major championship.

Japan Golf Tour playoff record (5–3)

Other wins (3)
1987 Masaaki Hirao Pro-Am
1989 Daiichi Fudosan Cup, Imperial Open

Japan PGA Senior Tour wins (3)
2012 Starts Senior Tournament, Komatsu Country Club
2014 Japan PGA Senior Championship

Playoff record
Champions Tour playoff record (0–1)

Results in major championships

CUT = missed the half-way cut
WD = Withdrew
"T" = tied

Results in The Players Championship

CUT = missed the halfway cut
"T" indicates a tie for a place

Results in World Golf Championships

1Cancelled due to 9/11

QF, R16, R32, R64 = Round in which player lost in match play
"T" = Tied
NT = No tournament

Team appearances
This list may be incomplete.
Four Tours World Championship (representing Japan): 1985, 1986 (winners), 1989, 1990
World Cup (representing Japan): 1985
Dunhill Cup (representing Japan): 1986, 1988, 1989, 1996
Presidents Cup (International team): 1998 (winners)
Royal Trophy (Asian team): 2007 (non-playing captain), 2009 (non-playing captain, winners), 2010 (non-playing captain), 2011 (non-playing captain), 2012 (winners, non-playing captain)

See also
List of golfers with most Japan Golf Tour wins

External links

Japanese male golfers
Japan Golf Tour golfers
PGA Tour Champions golfers
Sportspeople from Tokushima Prefecture
1956 births
Living people